Herman Obuhov (russian Герман Викторович Обухов; born November 27, 1949, in Chelyabinsk, USSR) is a Soviet dissident, author of five books and six screenplays, public figure, member of the International Academy of Information Science.

Biography
Born into the family of a graduate student - the future scientist of automation systems Viktor  Obuhov. The mother of Herman Obuhov - Dina Obuhov, a native of Privalov, was an engineer. In 1955, the family moved to Grozny, North Caucasus, where Herman's father got a job at the Grozny Oil Institute, but they left there in 1959 and moved to Minsk, where Viktor Obuhov found a more attractive job at the Academy of Sciences of the Belorussian SSR. In 1966, Herman graduated from school No. 1 in Minsk and entered the Minsk Radio Technical University.. He later transferred to the Leningrad Electrotechnical University (LETI) from where he successfully graduated in 1975. In 1982, Herman married Irina Akulova, the wedding took place in the "political zone" in the Northern Urals. In 1988, Herman Obuhov emigrated to the West, first to Great Britain at the invitation of Amnesty International, and then to the United States, where the U.S. Congress granted him political asylum in absentia

Social and political activities in the Soviet period
After graduating from the LETI University in 1975, Herman Obuhov began working as an engineer in the GSKT Bureau, one of the many electronic design bureaus of Leningrad, but the work of an engineer was not attractive to him and he took the initiative in to participate in public life. First, he was elected as a komsomol leader of the department, then the Deputy Secretary of the Komsomol committee of the GSKT Bureau for international affairs. He begins meetings with foreign delegations and party bosses. He was invited to work as a secretary in the Komsomol district committee with a mandatory entry into the CPSU, but he avoided this proposal and begins to understand the deceit of the Soviet system. After his car accident and canceled tourist trip to Finland-Sweden, he left the GSKT Bureau in 1977 and went to work at the Scientific Research Institute of Experimental Medicine, AMS USSR, headed by Natalia Bekhtereva, with a fairly liberal attitude to labor discipline and political views. From this moment in the life of Herman there is a cardinal change in relation to the Soviet regime and the CPSU. He begins frequent contacts with American students and western tourists. In 1978, he began writing the anticommunist book, The Extinguished Dawn. A year after studying all of world philosophy, when part of the manuscript was ready, he goes to the International Book Fair in Moscow in1979, where he meets the French publisher from Gallimard Annie Chevallier and the American publisher from Daubleday Publish House Alexander Hoffman. In 1980, his contacts with representatives of the Western world expanded and multiplied. He met Craig Whitney, the correspondent of New York Times and Anthony Barbiery, the correspondent of the Baltimore Sun. This does not go unnoticed by the KGB and he is constantly under surveillance.

Arrest and “political zones”
In 1981, during a trip from Leningrad to Moscow with the intention of handing over the unfinished manuscript “The Extinguished Dawn” to his acquaintances, publishers at the International Book Fair in Moscow, he was arrested and returned to Leningrad to the KGB pre-trial detention center. After 3 months of investigation, the Leningrad City Court sentenced him to 4 years of labor camps and 2 years of exile on charges of “anti-Soviet agitation and propaganda,” art. 70 of the Criminal Code of the RSFSR. Herman served his term in the labor camp ("political zone") of VS 389/37 in the village Polovinka, Chusovskoy area, Perm district. After the full term, Herman Obuhov was exiled to the backyards of the Soviet empire - to the village Ayan, Khabarovsk district on the shore of the Sea of Okhotsk. After completing his term, Herman was not allowed to live in Leningrad and was forced to emigrate abroad, which he did and flew into London.
.

Social and political activities in the post-Soviet period
As soon as Herman Obuhov settled in the United States and began working in 1990 as a biomedical engineer at Yale-New Haven Hospital, he returned to his political activity.. The Soviet Union collapsed and many politicians in the United States were interested in the opinions of former Soviet political prisoners regarding the new Russia.. Herman establishes the Russian-American Council for Economic Development (RACED) with the participation of the First Mayor of St. Petersburg, Anatoly Sobchak, and flies to St. Petersburg every year for meetings with friends, parents and politicians. There he meets the future president of Russia, Vladimir Putin. In the late 90s, having already become a US citizen, Herman moved to St. Petersburg for temporary residence and became a political adviser to the deputy, and later, Deputy Chairman of the Legislative Assembly of St. Petersburg Yuri Gladkov. He participates in many political events and conferences of the city and country. In 2005, Herman Obuhov establishes the Charity Foundation “Open the World to Children” and was elected as its president; later, the Nobel Prize winner academic Zhores Alferov, Head of the SPP (Union of Right Forces) party Nikita Belykh and Senator from St. Petersburg Vadim Tulpanov joined the Foundation on the board of trustees. The Foundation helped over two thousand orphans to get computer skills by delivering computer classes to children's homes. In 2014 Obuhov moved to Kyiv, Ukraine, to join the Maidan and create the Anti-Putin coalition, an informal association of public organizations and activists. In 2017, Herman establishes the Stop Inform Terror of Russia Foundation in Connecticut to resist Moscow's information sabotage.

Creative activity
In the post-Soviet period, Herman Obuhov wrote and published five books: The Extinguished Dawn 15 Years Later, The Times of the Filibusters, The Confiscated Letters, The Chasm and The Stolen Country, as well as six screenplays: Flight to Johannesburg, New Jersey Turnpike, Gold Bird in a Gold Cage, Titian's Gift, My Alaska and Trump's Friend – Head of the Russian Mafia. Herman has written and published on various sites, including Radio Liberty, more than 300 articles on various social and political topics.

References

External links 
 Herman Obuhov. Information about the author - Radio "Liberty" (Russian)
 Soviet Dissident Flies To London - Assotiated Press
 Herman Obuhov predicts the collapse of Russia - Berlin Visual (Russian) 
 Herman Obuhov. The Confiscated Letters (Russian)

1949 births
Writers from Chelyabinsk
Russian dissidents
Living people